Lee Cornwell is an English retired-American football defender who spent most of his career in the American indoor leagues.

In 1980, Cornwell moved to the United States from Leyton Orient to sign with the California Surf of the North American Soccer League. He played the 1979-1981 NASL indoor/outdoor season with the Surf. In 1981, Cornwell moved to the Baltimore Blast of the Major Indoor Soccer League. In 1982, he moved to the Los Angeles Lazers. The Lazers retired 1 November 1988. Cornwell became an American citizen during his time with the Lazers. In 1989, he spent one season with the California Kickers of the Western Soccer League.

External links
 NASL/MISL stats

References

Living people
1958 births
Footballers from Greater London
American soccer players
English footballers
English expatriate footballers
Baltimore Blast (1980–1992) players
California Surf players
California Kickers players
Major Indoor Soccer League (1978–1992) players
North American Soccer League (1968–1984) indoor players
Western Soccer Alliance players
Association football defenders
Los Angeles Lazers players
Leyton Orient F.C. players
English expatriate sportspeople in the United States
Expatriate soccer players in the United States